The 1999 Asian Junior Badminton Championships were held in Yangon, Myanmar from 11–17 July. This tournament organized by the Asian Badminton Confederation, and there were 24 countries and regions with more than 350 players and officials participated in the Championships.

Venue
The tournament was held at the National Indoor Stadium – 1 in Thuwunna, Yangon, Myanmar.

Medalists 
China and Indonesia captured a team gold and silver medal in the girls' and boys' team respectively. Korea and Malaysia shared third place in the boys' team event. In the girls' team event, Taiwan and Korea were co-bronze medalists. In the girls' team final, China beat Indonesia with the score 5–0, and Indonesia beat the China boys' team with the score 3–2. In the individuals event, Chinese squad took four of the five titles. Only the mixed doubles crown eluded the Chinese team when Indonesians Hendri Kurniawan Saputra and Enny Erlangga defeated China's Zheng Bo and Wei Yili in straight game 15–12 and 17–16.

Results

Semifinals

Finals

Medal table

References 

Badminton Asia Junior Championships
Asian Junior Badminton Championships
International sports competitions hosted by Myanmar
1999 in youth sport